Andrea Liberovici (born 1962 in Turin, Italy) is an Italian composer of contemporary classical music and a theatre director.

Biography 
The son of Sergio Liberovici (musician, Turin, 1930–1991) and Margot Galante Garrone, Andrea Liberovici studied composition, violin and viola at the conservatories of Venice and Turin. He also studied acting at the Scuola del Teatro Stabile in Genoa, and singing with Cathy Berberian at the International Festival in Montalcino in 1980. He recorded his first  at the age of fifteen.

As a composer and director, he co-founded Teatrodelsuono (theatre of sound) with poet Edoardo Sanguineti (librettist of Luciano Berio) and Ottavia Fusco.

Jean-Jacques Nattiez wrote, "Andrea Liberovici is a composer of his time. He define himself a modern. [...] We can find in his Frankenstein Cabaret a metaphor of the composer today. [...] he his a tragic musicians, a tragic-postmodern composer who tell about man and woman compared with the absurd and unbearable loneliness in which Internet borders more and more humanity."

Over the last decade, in collaboration with artists such as Peter Greenaway, Claudia Cardinale, Aldo Nove, Judith Malina, Vittorio Gassman, Giorgio Albertazzi, Enrico Ghezzi, Ivry Gitlis and Regina Carter, Liberovici has created many projects concerning the relationships between music, poetry, theatre, and technology.

Recently, those who have performed his music include Yuri Bashmet, Nouvel Ensemble Moderne (Montreal), Toscanini Orchestra, and Teatro Carlo Felice. His works have also been presented and produced by the Teatro di Roma (Rome), La Fenice (Venice), and Salle Olivier Messiaen (Paris). He has also worked in residence at INA-GRM (the Music Research Group of the Institut national de l'audiovisuel) and France Culture in Paris, STEIM (Studio for Electro-Instrumental Music) Center for Research and Development in Amsterdam, and the GMEM National Centre of Musical Creation in Marseille. His music and performances have been presented in Italy, New York, Paris, Athens, and Montreal.

Musical compositions 
64, Oratorio for actors in 64 movements through the acoustic memory of Living Theatre from J.Cage to now, with Judith Malina, Hanon Reznikov, Ottavia Fusco, GRM – INA,  Paris, 2000 
Frankenstein Cabaret, Festival Les Musiques, GMEM, Marseille, 2001 
Electronic Lied, GRM – INA, Paris, 2002 
Electronic Frankenstein, Teatro Carlo Felice, Genova, 2002 
Intégral, Radio France-France Culture, Paris, 2003 
Children of Uranium, concept and libretto Peter Greenaway, direction Saskia Boddeke, Genova, 2005 
Cunegonde's last journey to Irak, Festival Archipel, Geneva, 2005
Poètanz!, libretto Edoardo Sanguineti, Festival Oriente Occidente, Artemis Danza, Rovereto, 2006 
Titania la Rossa, libretto and direction Giorgio Albertazzi, Fondazione A. Toscanini, Piacenza, 2007
From Ivry, dedicated to Ivry Gitlis, with Nouvel Ensemble Moderne, Montreal, 2007
The Transparency of the Word – cantata for Primo Levi, libretto Emilio Jona music and video Andrea Liberovici, with Nouvel Ensemble Moderne,  International Symposium "New Voices on Primo Levi", Asia Society, New York, 26 October 2010
Springing from the Heart, libretto Daisaku Ikeda, Festival Les Musiques, GMEM, Marsiglia, 2010
Non un Silenzio, for viola, string orchestra and celesta, commissioned from Yuri Bashmet and Moscow Soloists, Teatro La Fenice, Venezia, 2014
MAVRYA, dedicated to Martha Argerich and Ivry Gitlis, for violin and piano, Lugano Festival - Martha Argerich Project, Lugano, 2015

Dramas 
Rap, text by Edoardo Sanguineti, music and direction Andrea Liberovici Teatro della Tosse, Genoa, 1996 
Sonetto, text by Edoardo Sanguineti, music and direction Andrea Liberovici Teatro Carlo Felice, Genoa, 1997 
Macbeth Remix, da W. Shakespeare, text by Edoardo Sanguineti, music and direction Andrea Liberovici Spoleto Festival, Spoleto, 1998 
Seipersonaggi.com, da L. Pirandello, text by Edoardo Sanguineti, music and direction Andrea Liberovici Teatro Stabile, Genoa, 2001 
Concerto per Roma, with Giorgio Albertazzi, Uto Ughi, Teatro Argentina, Rome, 2002 
Quaderni di Serafino Gubbio operatore, by Luigi Pirandello, Teatro Stabile, Rome, 2002 
Candido. Soap opera musical, text by Aldo Nove and Andrea Liberovici, Teatro Stabile, Genoa, 2004 
Centurie, by Manganelli, Calvino, Trilussa, with Massimo Popolizio, XXXVIII Festival di Borgio Verezzi, Borgio Verezzi, 2004 
Urfaust, by J. W. Goethe, with Ugo Pagliai and Paola Gassman, XXXIX Festival di Borgio Verezzi, Teatro Stabile, Genoa, Teatro Stabile del Veneto, Borgio Verezzi, 2005 
The Glass Managerie, by Tennessee Williams with Claudia Cardinale, Fox&Gould, Rome, 2006 
Nel Nome di Gesù di Corrado Augias, with Paolo Bonacelli, music and direction A. Liberovici, Teatro Stabile, Genoa, 2010
Operetta in Nero musica, testo, video e regia Andrea Liberovici, with Helga Davis, Teatro Stabile, Genoa, 2011
Fiona di Mauro Covacich, musica e regia Andrea Liberovici, Teatro Stabile, Trieste, 2012

Cinema 
 2008 – Postcards from Faust, 9 to 6 minutes in illusions
 2006 – Work in Regress, an assembly
 2004 – 500.000 Lions, The Last Hours of J.W. or Tarzan or J.W.
 2003 – Il teatro immateriale, Rai Sat show

Books 
Officina Liberovici, Marsilio, 2006,  (catalog)
Candido. Soap opera musical, Il Melangolo, 2004,  (libretto of the play)
l mio amore è come una febbre e mi rovescio, Andrea Liberovici and Edoardo Sanguineti Bompiani, 1998,

Discography 
 1978 – ORO (CGD, LP)
 1980 – Liberovici (CGD, 20194, LP, CD)
 1992 – Pranzo di famiglia (Carosello, CD)
 1996 – Rap (Fonit Cetra, CD)
 1998 – Sonetto (Devega Edizioni)
 2001 – 64 (GRM-INA, Francia)
 2003 – Electronic Frankenstein (GMEM, Francia)

References

1962 births
Living people
Italian classical musicians
Italian composers
Italian theatre directors
Musicians from Turin
Theatre people from Turin